Slavic carnivals are known under different names in various Slavic countries: ; ; ; ; ; ; ; ; . They are traditional Slavic festivals related to the period of carnival.

Sirni zagovezni in Bulgaria 

Sirni zagovezni (also called Sinitsi and Sirni pokladi) takes place seven weeks before Easter. The celebration takes place on Sunday, as that was the day of Christ's resurrection. Believers go to (Orthodox) Church early in the morning. Traditionally, the children ask for forgiveness from their parents, just as the parents ask the same of their grandparents. The youngest people ask for forgiveness from the oldest, then the elders ask for forgiveness from those who are younger. According to tradition, participants wear masks and celebrate the carnival at home. It symbolizes the victory of light over darkness (the coming of spring).

Kukeri 

Kukeri (singular: kuker, кукер) are elaborately costumed Bulgarian men who perform traditional rituals intended to scare away evil spirits. Closely related traditions are found throughout the Balkans and Greece (including Romania and the Pontus). The costumes cover most of the body and include decorated wooden masks of animals (sometimes double-faced) and large bells attached to the belt.  Around New Year and before Lent, the kukeri walk and dance through villages to scare away evil spirits with their costumes and the sound of their bells. They are also believed to provide a good harvest, health, and happiness to the village during the year.

Masopust in the Czech Republic

Masopust or the time of carnivals used to be in the past the period from the Twelfth Night until Ash Wednesday. A Lenten period begins on Ash Wednesday before Easter. A fancy dress fun which is held as a rule on the Lenten  Tuesday is the culmination of Masopust. The name carnival is a synonymous  word to the name masopust, but currently the name masopust is used for marking the carnival festivity.

Masopust and especially the few last days of this period (fašank, končiny) was an official holiday of feasting for people in the past. During these days people were supposed to eat one’s fill, therefore, huge dinner parties were held. Then, the forty days long Lent followed and mostly lentils, baked potatoes, eggs, cheese, and boiled semolina were consumed.

In some regions (Chodsko, Doudlebsko, Hlinecko etc.) a ceremonial procession of masks is a part of the festivity which goes through a village with music. In many places liquor, eggs, ham or doughnuts are collected and are consumed later on in a pub during a village party.
In same processions a serious attention is given to a dance, mainly, to the ceremonial dances of young men who are called "bobkovníci" or "Turci". During the party other ceremonial dances are performed. These are called "na len" or "žabská".
In many other localities the festivity is made without these ceremonial components. There is only the presentation of masks left and it is a form of rural popular amusement which is connected with one particular date.

The word fašank is created from mangling the German word Fasching which has got the same meaning. The word carnival comes from Roman languages, exactly from a connection of words carne (meat) and vale (leave). This word formation describes the situation when the meat is already eaten and there is nothing left. Another interpretation might be hidden behind the Latin words "carrus navalis", which means a ship of Fools.

Zapusty in Poland 

The Polish carnival season includes Fat Thursday (Polish: Tłusty Czwartek), when pączki (doughnuts) are eaten, and Śledzik (Shrove Tuesday) or Herring Day. The Tuesday before the start of Lent is also often called Ostatki (literally "leftovers"), meaning the last day to party before the Lenten season.

The traditional way to celebrate Zapusty is the kulig, a horse-drawn sleigh ride through the snow-covered countryside. In modern times, carnival is increasingly seen as an excuse for intensive partying and has become more commercialized, with stores offering carnival-season sales.

Maslenitsa in Russia and Ukraine 

Maslenitsa is an Eastern Slavic religious and folk holiday, celebrated during the last week before Great Lent, that is, the eighth week before Eastern Orthodox Pascha (Easter). Maslenitsa corresponds to the Western Christian Carnival, except that Orthodox Lent begins on a Monday instead of a Wednesday, and the Orthodox date of Easter can differ greatly from the Western Christian date.

According to archeological evidence from 2nd century A.D. Maslenitsa may be the oldest surviving Slavic holiday. 
Maslenitsa has its origins in the pagan tradition. In Slavic mythology, Maslenitsa is a sun-festival, personified by the ancient god Volos, and a celebration of the imminent end of the winter. In the Christian tradition, Maslenitsa is the last week before the onset of Great Lent.

In some regions, each day of Maslenitsa had its traditional activity. Monday may be the welcoming of “Lady Maslenitsa”. The community builds the Maslenitsa effigy out of straw (из соломы), decorated with pieces of rags, and fixed to a pole formerly known as Kostroma. It is paraded around and the first pancakes may be made and offered to the poor. On Tuesday, young men might search for a fiancée to marry after lent. On Wednesday sons-in-law may visit their mother-in-law who has prepared pancakes and invited other guests for a party. Thursday may be devoted to outdoor activities. People may take off work and spend the day sledding, ice skating, snowball fights and with sleigh rides. On Friday sons-in-law may invite their mothers-in-law for dinner.  Saturday may be a gathering of a young wife with her sisters-in-law to work on a good relationship.

The last day of Cheesefare Week is called "Forgiveness Sunday" (Прощённое Воскресенье). Relatives and friends ask each other for forgiveness and might offer them small presents.
As the culmination of the celebration people gather to "strip Lady Maslenitsa of her finery" and burn her in a bonfire. Left-over pancakes may also be thrown into the fire and Lady Maslenitsa's ashes are buried in the snow to "fertilize the crops".

Kurentovanje in Slovenia 

Kurentovanje is one of Slovenia's most popular and ethnologically significant carnival events. This 10-day rite of spring and fertility is celebrated on Shrove Sunday in Ptuj, the oldest documented city in the region, and draws around 10,000 participants each year.

Its main figure, known as Kurent or Korent, was seen as an extravagant god of unrestrained pleasure and hedonism in early Slavic customs. In today's festival, groups of kurents or kurenti wear traditional sheepskin garments while holding wooden clubs with hedgehog skins attached called ježevke, the noise of which is believed to "chase away winter". In this way, the presence of kurenti announces the end of winter and beginning of spring. Being a kurent was at first a privilege offered only to unmarried men, but today, married men, children and women are also invited to wear the outfit.

In 2010, the 50th anniversary of the first organized instance of this festival was celebrated. As the host of the festival, the town of Ptuj was admitted into the European Federation of Carnival Cities in 1991.

Zvončari in Croatia 

Zvončari (the bellmen) is the characteristic folk custom maintained in the region around Rijeka, Croatia. It was added to UNESCO's Representative List of the Intangible Cultural Heritage of Humanity in 2009.

The custom dates to pagan antiquity, and remains typical for this region. The primary task of Zvončari is to scare away evil spirits of winter and to stir up new spring-time cycle. During the Rijeka Carnival time Zvončari march from village to village throughout the region, following the same centuries-old route, making an extraordinary amount of noise, fueled in part by the wine provided by the locals en route.

Busójárás in Hungary 

The Busójárás (Hungarian, meaning "Busó-walking"; in Croatian: Pohod bušara) is an annual celebration of the Šokci living in the town of Mohács, Hungary, held at the end of the Carnival season ("Farsang"), ending the day before Ash Wednesday. The celebration features Busós (people wearing traditional masks) and includes folk music, masquerading, parades and dancing. Busójárás lasts six days, usually during February. It starts on a Thursday, followed by the Kisfarsang (Little Farsang) carnival on Friday, with the biggest celebration, Farsang vasárnap (Farsang Sunday) on the seventh Sunday before Easter Sunday; the celebration then ends with Farsangtemetés (Burial of Farsang) on the following Tuesday (Shrove Tuesday or Mardi Gras).
These traditional festivities have been inscribed on the Representative List of the Intangible Cultural Heritage of Humanity of the UNESCO in 2009.

See also 

 Fat Thursday
 Shrove Tuesday

References

External links 
 Polish Festivals and Traditions

Eastern Orthodox Christian culture
 
Belarusian traditions
Bulgarian traditions
Carnival
Czech traditions
Polish traditions
Russian traditions
Serbian traditions
Slavic holidays
Slovak traditions
Ukrainian traditions